So What? is an album by bassist Ron Carter recorded in 1998 and originally released on the Japanese Somethin' Else label with a US release on Blue Note Records.

Reception

The AllMusic review by Michael G. Nastos observed "Truly a team effort, this consistently well-played set should remind us all how brilliant these players are, especially with the cool Count Basie concept of "less is more" in mind".

Track listing 
All compositions by Ron Carter except where noted
 "So What" (Miles Davis) – 6:47
 "You'd Be So Nice to Come Home To" (Cole Porter) – 4:35
 "It's About Time" – 5:14
 "My Foolish Heart" (Victor Young, Ned Washington) – 8:15	
 "Hi-Fly" (Randy Weston) – 6:02
 "3 More Days" – 7:35
 "Eddie's Theme" – 3:54
 "The Third Plane" – 4:55

Personnel 
Ron Carter - bass 
Kenny Barron – piano
Lewis Nash – drums

References 

Ron Carter albums
1998 albums
Blue Note Records albums